Sandland is a village in Loppa Municipality in Troms og Finnmark county, Norway. The village is located on the mainland part of Loppa, along the Sandlands fjorden, across from the uninhabited island of Silda. Sandland Chapel is located in the village.

Sandland is connected to Sør-Tverrfjord and a few other small villages by a road along the shore of the Sandlandsfjorden; however, this road is not connected to anything else.  The only connection to the rest of Norway is a ferry that travels between the three villages of Øksfjord to Bergsfjord to Sør-Tverrfjord.

References

Villages in Finnmark
Loppa
Populated places of Arctic Norway